Daniel Collins Baker (October 14, 1816 – July 19, 1863) was a Massachusetts politician who served as the third Mayor of Lynn, Massachusetts.

References
Bibliography

Notes

1816 births
1863 deaths
Lynn, Massachusetts City Council members
Massachusetts state senators
Mayors of Lynn, Massachusetts
19th-century American politicians